The fixture between IFK Malmö and Malmö FF is a local derby in Malmö, Sweden  and was a fierce rivalry from the beginning of the 1910s to the 1960s when the two clubs regularly played against each other. The story of the rivalry between the clubs dates back to 1909 when BK Idrott joined IFK Malmö's football department but later broke away from the club in 1910 due to differences between the two clubs. The founders of BK Idrott then founded Malmö FF in 1910. IFK Malmö are Malmö's oldest football club, having been founded in 1899. Before the creation of official leagues for Swedish club football, IFK Malmö and Malmö FF played against each other in "Distriktsmästerkapen", the regional championship. The clubs later played against each other in both the second tier league and first tier league, Allsvenskan. The last time the two clubs were in the same league was in 1962 when they were both playing in Allsvenskan; IFK Malmö were relegated and have since not returned while Malmö FF have played in Allsvenskan for every season since 1926 except for one season. Rivalry between the clubs died out when they were no longer playing in the same league although they have played each other one time after this on 13 August 1986 in a Svenska Cupen fixture, which Malmö FF won, 3–1.

Rivalry
The rivalry is primarily of geographic nature as both teams are from Malmö, however a major cause for the rivalry is also an incident in 1934 with both clubs involved. Malmö FF were relegated from Allsvenskan as a penalty for breaking amateur regulations. The club had paid their players a small sum of money for each game. Although against the rules, this was common at the time; Malmö FF were the only club to show it in their accounting records. In addition to relegation to Division 2, the club suffered bans for the entire board of directors and twenty-six players. The version of events told by Malmö FF and local press suggests that local rival IFK Malmö reported the violation to the Swedish Football Association. This belief has contributed to the longstanding competitive tensions between the clubs.

Malmö FF was also the club of the workers class and closely tied to the Social Democratic party, while IFK Malmö was the club of the middle class.

Statistics

Table correct as of 16 April 2011

Last five head-to-head fixtures

All-time results

IFK Malmö in the league at home

Malmö FF in the league at home

Results at home in Cup matches
Includes fixtures for the regional competition "Distriktsmästerskapet".

References

Bibliography

External links
 Sveriges Fotbollshistoriker och Statistiker – Statistics for all Allsvenskan and Svenska Cupen matches
 IFK Malmö official website 
 Malmö FF official website

Malmö FF
Football derbies in Sweden
IFK Malmö
Football in Malmö